Mamie Van Doren (born Joan Lucille Olander; February 6, 1931) is an American actress, singer, and sex symbol. She is perhaps best known for the rock 'n' roll, juvenile delinquency exploitation film Untamed Youth (1957).

Early life 
Van Doren was born on February 6, 1931, in Rowena, South Dakota, the daughter of Warner Carl Olander and Lucille Harriet Bennett. She is of three-quarters Swedish ancestry; the remainder is mixed English and German. In 1939, the family moved to Sioux City, Iowa, and then to Los Angeles during May 1942.

In early 1946, Van Doren began working as an usher at the Pantages Theatre in Hollywood. The following year, she had a bit part on an early television series. She sang with Ted Fio Rito's band and entered several beauty contests. At age 17, she eloped to Santa Barbara, California, with Jack Newman, but because of his abusive nature the marriage was quickly dissolved. In the summer of 1949, at age 18, she won the titles Miss Eight Ball and Miss Palm Springs. She was engaged to heavyweight boxing champion Jack Dempsey, but broke the engagement upon signing a contract with Universal Studios.

Producer Howard Hughes discovered Van Doren when she was crowned Miss Palm Springs. The pair dated for several years. Hughes launched her career by placing her in several RKO films.

Career

Early years (1951–1952) 
In 1950, Hughes provided Van Doren with a bit part in Jet Pilot at RKO Radio Pictures, which was her film debut. Her line of dialogue consisted of one word, "Look!" and she appears uncredited in the film. Though production of the movie was from 1949 to 1953 (delays by Hughes), it was not released until 1957. The following year, 1951, she posed for pin-up girl artist Alberto Vargas.

Van Doren did a few more bit parts in movies at RKO, including His Kind of Woman (1951) starring Robert Mitchum, Jane Russell and Vincent Price. About her appearance in this movie, Van Doren said "If you blinked you would miss me. I look barely old enough to drive."

Van Doren then began working on the stage. She was a showgirl in New York City in Monte Proser's nightclub version of Billion Dollar Baby. Songwriter Jimmy McHugh discovered her for his musicals, then decided she was too good for the chorus line and should have dramatic training. She studied with Ben Bard and Bliss-Hayden. While appearing in the role of Marie in a showcase production of Come Back, Little Sheba, Van Doren was seen by Phil Benjamin, a casting director at Universal International.

Further success (1953–1959) 

On January 20, 1953, Van Doren signed a contract with Universal Studios. They had big plans for her, hoping she would bring the same kind of success that 20th Century Fox had with Marilyn Monroe. Van Doren, whose signing day coincided with the inauguration of President Eisenhower, was given the first name Mamie for Ike's wife, Mamie Eisenhower. Other Van Dorens, who were unrelated to Mamie, were a prominent and noted family of American intellectuals; these Van Dorens included two Pulitzer Prize-winning brothers, Carl (biographer) and Mark (poet), and Mark's wife Dorothy, an academic and historian.

Universal first cast Van Doren in a minor role as a singer in Forbidden, starring Tony Curtis. Interested in Van Doren's allure, Universal then cast her in The All American (1953), (also starring Tony Curtis), playing her first major role as Susie Ward, a wayward girl who is the man-trap at a campus beer joint. In Yankee Pasha (1954), starring Jeff Chandler and Rhonda Fleming, she played a slave girl in a supporting role. In 1955, she had a supporting role in the musical Ain't Misbehavin' and starred in the crime-drama Running Wild. Van Doren turned down a Broadway role in the play Will Success Spoil Rock Hunter? and was replaced by newcomer Jayne Mansfield.

In 1956, Van Doren appeared opposite a young and unknown Clint Eastwood in Star in the Dust. Though Van Doren garnered prominent billing alongside John Agar and Richard Boone, she appears rather briefly, as the daughter of a ranch owner. By this time, Van Doren had grown tired of Universal, which was casting her in non-breakthrough roles. Van Doren began accepting bigger and better roles in better movies from other studios.

Van Doren went on to star in several bad girl movies that later became cult films. She also appeared in some of the first movies to feature rock 'n' roll music and became identified with this rebellious style, and she made some rock records. One of her rock 'n' roll films, Untamed Youth, later was featured in the 1990 Mystery Science Theater 3000 episode "Untamed Youth".

Some of Van Doren's more noteworthy movies include Teacher's Pet (1958) at Paramount Pictures, Born Reckless (1958) at Warner Brothers, High School Confidential (1958), and The Beat Generation (1959), the latter two at Metro-Goldwyn-Mayer. But Van Doren was just as well known for her provocative roles. She was in prison for Girls Town (1959), which provoked censors with a shower scene where audiences could see Van Doren's naked back. As Eve in The Private Lives of Adam and Eve (1960) she wore only fig leaves, and in other films, like The Beautiful Legs of Sabrina (1959), Sex Kittens Go to College (1960), and Vice Raid (1960) audiences understood the nature of the films from the titles.

Many of Van Doren's film roles showcased her ample curves, and her onscreen wardrobe usually consisted of tight sweaters, low-cut blouses, form-fitting dresses, and daring (for the era) swimsuits, but she and such other blonde bombshell contemporaries as Jayne Mansfield, Cleo Moore, Sheree North, Anita Ekberg, Barbara Lang, Joi Lansing, Greta Thyssen, and Barbara Nichols did not attain the same level of superstar status as Marilyn Monroe. Marilyn, Mamie, and Mansfield were known as "The Three M's". But by comparison, where Monroe succeeded in Gentlemen Prefer Blondes and Mansfield had big success replacing Van Doren in Will Success Spoil Rock Hunter?, Universal stuck Van Doren with Francis the Talking Mule in Francis Joins the WACS (1954).

Since 1959 

After Universal Studios chose not to renew her contract in 1959, Van Doren became a free agent and struggled to find work. Some of her later movies were foreign and independent productions, which did little to keep her image in the public's eye. Many of the productions were low-budget B movies with some having gained a cult following for their high camp value.

The first of these later films was Sex Kittens Go to College (1960), which co-starred Tuesday Weld. Following the completion of the Argentine film The Blonde from Buenos Aires (1961), Van Doren took time off from her career. She came back in The Candidate (1964), soon followed by Freddy in the Wild West, both of which were low-budget films that left little impact. In 1964, Tommy Noonan convinced Van Doren to appear in 3 Nuts in Search of a Bolt. Van Doren had turned down Noonan's previous offer to star opposite Jayne Mansfield in Promises! Promises!, and was replaced with Marie McDonald. In 3 Nuts in Search of a Bolt, Mamie did a beer-bath scene but is not seen nude. She posed for Playboy to promote the film.

Van Doren next appeared in The Las Vegas Hillbillys (1966) released by Woolner Brothers. This film co-starred Mansfield; this was the only time two of "The Three M's" appeared together in a film. A sequel was titled Hillbillys in a Haunted House, but Van Doren turned this role down, and was replaced by Joi Lansing. She then appeared in The Navy vs. the Night Monsters (1966), a science fiction movie. In 1967, she appeared in You've Got to Be Smart, and starred in the science fiction film Voyage to the Planet of Prehistoric Women (1968), the following year, directed by Peter Bogdanovich.

Van Doren also developed a nightclub act and did live theater. She performed in stage productions of Gentlemen Prefer Blondes and Dames at Sea at the Drury Lane Theater in Chicago as well as appeared in Will Success Spoil Rock Hunter? and The Tender Trap at the Arlington Park Theater. In the 1970s, Van Doren performed a nightclub act in Las Vegas.

In 1970, Van Doren had a supporting role in the western comedy The Arizona Kid. In 1975, she starred in the film That Girl From Boston, adapted from a Robert Rimmer novel, but the film was never released. Since then, Van Doren has appeared only in cameos in low-budget films. Van Doren's last film appearance was a role in the direct-to-video drama  The American Tetralogy  (2013).

Van Doren's guest appearances on television include Jukebox Jury, What's My Line, The Bob Cummings Show, The Jack Benny Show, Fantasy Island, Burke's Law, Vega$ and L.A. Law.

Van Doren released Playing the Field (1987), her autobiography, which brought much attention and proved to be her biggest media splash in over 25 years. She has consistently denied in interviews ever having breast implants. In 2006, Mamie posed for photographs for Vanity Fair with Pamela Anderson as part of its annual Hollywood issue.

In an interview with Fox News in February 2020, Van Doren announced that she was working on a follow-up to her autobiography. She remarked that "...a lot has happened between 1987 and 2020. So now I'm writing about what it's like getting older and appreciating life a little more as you go along, as well as getting smarter as you get older. There's so much to write about."

The title of her follow-up book was announced in December 2021 as "China & Me: Wind Flapping, Feather Pulling, and Love on the Wing", a memoir about her pet parrot China. Van Doren describes the story as "a look behind the curtain into my everyday life. It's often funny, but, like so many things in life, it has its moments of sadness. Over the decades I've integrated a wild animal into a human household, played matchmaker to find him a mate, and cared for his offspring. I'm blessed to have had China as companion, confessor, and straight man all these years; and he's still with me today." The book was published in September 2022.

In an interview with Closer in January 2021, she also reflected on the #MeToo movement, 'I've thought a lot about that. There are some things I would question, but I've also always been behind any woman with a problem because I have had plenty of them myself. [In my time] if I wanted to go to bed with someone, I'd go to bed with them, but I never did it for a movie. [A predator] would know that he was in for a fight if he ever came around me. [It would be] nails out, kicking and screaming.'

Personal life 

Van Doren has been married five times. In 1949, she married sportswear manufacturer Jack Newman; she divorced him later that same year. Her second marriage was to bandleader, composer and actor Ray Anthony whom she married in 1955. They had one son, Perry Ray Anthony, born March 18, 1956. The couple divorced in 1961. When Van Doren's early 1960s, highly publicized, on-again off-again engagement to baseball player Bo Belinsky ended in 1964, she married baseball player Lee Meyers in 1966. They divorced in 1968. Her fourth marriage was to businessman Ross McClintock in 1972. They met while working on President Nixon's re-election campaign; the marriage was annulled in 1973. Since 1979, she has been married to Thomas Dixon, an actor and dentist.

In her autobiography, Van Doren acknowledged that she had numerous affairs with celebrities, including Clark Gable, Howard Hughes, Burt Reynolds, Jack Dempsey, Steve McQueen, Clint Eastwood, Johnny Rivers, Robert Evans, Eddie Fisher, Warren Beatty, Tony Curtis, Steve Cochran, and Joe Namath. Claiming fidelity to each lover, she said "I don't wear panties anymore – this startles the Hollywood wolves so much they don't know what to pull at, so they leave me alone."

Van Doren was never a Playboy Playmate, but she posed twice for the magazine in 1964 to promote her movie 3 Nuts in Search of a Bolt (1964). By this point in her career, her figure measured 38DD-26-36 (self-described in 1997). She said "I don't even want to say double-D because they're even bigger than that."

In 1964, Van Doren was a guest at the Whisky a Go Go on the Sunset Strip in West Hollywood, California when The Beatles were at the club visiting with Jayne Mansfield, and an inebriated George Harrison accidentally threw his drink on her when trying to throw it on some bothersome journalists. During the Vietnam War, she did tours for U.S. troops in Vietnam for three months in 1968, and again in 1970. In addition to USO shows, she visited hospitals, including the wards of amputees and burn victims.

In 1980, Van Doren was referenced in the controversial Canadian Top 20 hit "High School Confidential" by the popular 1980s Canadian new wave band Rough Trade.

In recent years, Van Doren has made use of multimedia, including Facebook and Twitter. She and her husband Thomas maintain her website where various merchandise along with home-made short films starring herself, such as A Girl and Her Banana which show many videos of her posing for photo shoots from the 2000s, many of them where she is naked. In the early 2000s and late 1990s, Mamie did many nude and semi-nude photos which show her big breasts which were posted on her site. She had done many with Julie Strain. The website has already been shut down, instead since 2013 Van Doren started her own blog on which she regularly writes about a very diverse array of topics. As of February 2023 she is still posting messages on her blog. 
 She has a star on the Hollywood Walk of Fame at 7057 Hollywood Boulevard. In 2005, a Golden Palm Star on the Palm Springs Walk of Stars was dedicated to her.

Film appearances

Discography

Albums

Singles

References

External links 

 Official website (archived)
 
 
 
 Bombshells away, at Salon, Karen Abbott, July 19, 2000.
 Mamie Van Doren interview by Sandra Bernhard

1931 births
Living people
American film actresses
American stage actresses
American television actresses
Female models from South Dakota
American women singers
American bloggers
Jubilee Records artists
American people of Swedish descent
People from Minnehaha County, South Dakota
Musicians from Newport Beach, California
Actresses from South Dakota
Actresses from Newport Beach, California
American women bloggers
Writers from South Dakota
21st-century American actresses